Capperia agadirensis is a moth of the family Pterophoridae which is endemic to Morocco.

References

Moths described in 2002
Moths of Africa
Oxyptilini
Endemic fauna of Morocco